Lamp Unto My Feet was an American ecumenical religious program that was produced by CBS Television and broadcast from 1948 to 1979 on Sunday mornings. The title comes from Psalm 119: "Thy word is a lamp unto my feet, and a light unto my path."

Overview
The program used a combination of drama, music, and dance to explore the histories, cultures and theological philosophies of the Protestant, Catholic and Jewish faiths. Most episodes in later seasons followed a reality-based documentary format, featuring various faith-based organizations and figures; a 1969 installment profiled the Lend-A-Hand Center in Knox County, Kentucky, and a 1970 installment featured Elizabeth Platz, the first woman in North America ordained by a Lutheran church body.

In 1979 this program and another long-running CBS religious series, Look Up and Live, were combined to form a new show called For Our Times (April 28, 1979 to 1988), sponsored by the National Council of Churches, New York Board of Rabbis, and U.S. Conference of Catholic Bishops.

The introduction was a simple voice-over, proclaiming "It is better to light one candle, than to curse the darkness," while a candle was being lit in a dark room.

Guest stars
Notable guest stars included Mahalia Jackson, Kim Hunter, Luther Adler, Edward Mulhare, Arthur Hill, Eydie Gorme, The Ink Spots, and Aline MacMahon.

See also
Stained Glass Windows (ABC Television, 1948)
Elder Michaux (DuMont Television Network, 1948)

References

External links
 
 

1948 American television series debuts
1979 American television series endings
1940s American drama television series
1950s American drama television series
1960s American drama television series
1970s American drama television series
Black-and-white American television shows
CBS original programming
English-language television shows
American religious television series